Heebee Jeebees is a 1927 Our Gang short silent comedy film directed by Robert F. McGowan and Anthony Mack. It was the 67th Our Gang short that was released and is considered to have been lost in the 1965 MGM vault fire.

Cast

The Gang
 Joe Cobb as Joe
 Jackie Condon as Jackie
 Jean Darling as Jean
 Allen Hoskins as Farina
 Bobby Hutchins as Wheezer
 Jay R. Smith as Jay
 Harry Spear as Harry
 Pete the Pup as Pansy

Additional cast
 Mildred Kornman as Party guest
 Richard and Robert Smith as Twins at party
 Charles A. Bachman as Officer
 George B. French as Prof. Electra
 Lyle Tayo as Joe's mother
 Dorothy Vernon as Wheezer's mother

See also
 Our Gang filmography

References

External links
 
 

1927 films
1927 comedy films
1927 short films
1927 lost films
American silent short films
American black-and-white films
Films directed by Robert F. McGowan
Films directed by Robert A. McGowan
Lost American films
Lost comedy films
Metro-Goldwyn-Mayer short films
Our Gang films
1920s American films
Silent American comedy films